Lawrence Kenneth Moss (November 18, 1927 – June 24, 2022) was an American composer of contemporary classical music. He was born in Los Angeles.

He held a B.A. degree from the University of California, Los Angeles, an M.A. from the Eastman School of Music, and a Ph.D. in music composition from the University of Southern California, where his instructors included Leon Kirchner and Ingolf Dahl.

He taught at Mills College, Yale University (1960-1968), and the University of Maryland, College Park (1969-2014). His notable students include Jeffrey Mumford, Liviu Marinescu, Julia Stilman-Lasansky, and Susan Cohn Lackman.

He received two Guggenheim Fellowships (1959 and 1968), a Fulbright Scholarship, and four grants from the National Endowment for the Arts.

Moss composed operatic, instrumental, and electronic music. His music is published by Theodore Presser, Association for the
Promotion of New Music (A.P.N.M.), McGinnis & Marx, Alfred Publishing Co., Roncorp Inc., Northeastern Music Programs, and Seesaw Music Corp.

His music has been recorded on the CRI, Desto, Opus One, Albany, Capstone, Orion, EMF, Spectrum, Advance, and AmCam labels.

Moss died in Silver Spring, Maryland on June 24, 2022, aged 94.

References

External links
Lawrence Moss faculty page from University of Maryland site
Lawrence K. Moss biography
Personal website
Interview with Lawrence Moss, September 5, 1987

1927 births
2022 deaths
20th-century classical composers
American male classical composers
American classical composers
University of California, Los Angeles alumni
Eastman School of Music alumni
USC Thornton School of Music alumni
University of Maryland, College Park faculty
Yale University faculty
People from Silver Spring, Maryland
20th-century American composers
20th-century American male musicians
Fulbright alumni